Chiesa di San Pietro (San Marino) is a church in San Marino. It belongs to the Roman Catholic Diocese of San Marino-Montefeltro. It was founded in 1689.

Roman Catholic churches in San Marino
Buildings and structures in the City of San Marino
Roman Catholic churches completed in 1689
1689 establishments in Europe